National Geographic Oceania is a subscription television documentary network in Oceania that features programmes on subjects such as nature, science, culture and history, plus some reality television and pseudo-scientific entertainment programming. It is the Oceanian version of the National Geographic Channel Asia Pacific.  it has been the only Disney-owned network in Oceania (alongside Nat Geo Wild and ESPN) to broadcast as a linear television channel, with the Disney Channel and Disney Junior having been shut down in favour of the streaming service Disney+.

Overview
Many of the network's documentaries are produced by the National Geographic Society. It features some programming similar to that on the Discovery Channel and History, such as nature and science documentaries. The channel is available through Foxtel, Optus (through Foxtel), and Fetch TV in Australia, and on Sky and Vodafone TV (through Sky) in New Zealand. Its advertising sales are handled by Multi Channel Network.

It had two sister channels: Nat Geo Wild and Nat Geo People.

History
National Geographic Channel was launched as high-definition simulcast channel on 22 June 2008. On 14 November 2016, the word "Channel" was dropped from its name and branding, at the same time as other network channels around the world.

National Geographic, alongside Nat Geo Wild, were both removed from Foxtel on March 1, 2023 and will permanently cease broadcasting on 1 April 2023 in Australia and New Zealand, after leaving Fetch TV and Sky.

Programmes

Original Programming

Aussie Firework Kings
Aussie Recipes That Rock
Aussie Icons with H.G. Nelson
Australia: Life on the Edge
Australia: The Time Traveller's Guide
Australia’s Desert War
Australia's Hardest Prison
Tales by Light

Acquired programming

Australia's hardest Prison: Lockdown Oz
World's Hardest Prison: Banged Up Abroad
Air Crash Investigation
Crystal Skull
Be The Creature
Big Bang
Brain Games
Built for the Kill
End Day
Escape Tech
Explorations Powered by Duracell
Explorer
Gospel of Judas
Hollywood Science
Hunter Hunted
I Didn't Know That
Interpol Investigates
Is It Real?
Living Wild
Megacities
Megafactories
MegaStructures
Mysteries of the Deep
Naked Science
No Borders
Perfect Weapon
Planet Football
Planet Mechanics
Predators at War
Rough Trades
Science of the Bible
Seconds From Disaster
StarTalk
Storm Stories
Strange Days on Planet Earth
Taboo
The Dog Whisperer
The Living Edens
Thrill Zone
Thunder Beasts
Totally Wild
Trading Faces
Ultimate Airport Dubai
What Would Happen If...? 
World of Wildlife

Notes

References

External links

Australia and New Zealand
Television networks in Australia
Television channels and stations established in 1997
Television channels and stations disestablished in 2023
Defunct television channels in Australia
English-language television stations in Australia
1997 establishments in Australia
2023 disestablishments in Australia